The 2023 World Para Alpine Skiing Championships was an international disability sport alpine skiing event held in Lleida, Spain from 20 to 29 January. The championships are held biannually by the International Paralympic Committee (IPC).

Men's events

Women's events

References

External links
World Para Alpine Skiing website

World Para Alpine Skiing Championships
Alpine skiing competitions in Spain
World Para Alpine Skiing